Windows Management Instrumentation Query Language (WQL) is Microsoft's implementation of the CIM Query Language (CQL), a query language for the Common Information Model (CIM) standard from the Distributed Management Task Force (DMTF). It is a subset of ANSI standard SQL with minor semantic changes.

WQL is dedicated to WMI and is designed to perform queries against the CIM repository to retrieve information or get event notifications.

Example
As an example, the following WQL query selects all the drives on a computer that have less than 2 MB of free space:

SELECT * FROM Win32_LogicalDisk WHERE FreeSpace < 2097152

See also
 Windows Management Instrumentation (WMI)
 Common Information Model (CIM)
 Web-Based Enterprise Management (WBEM)
 Windows PowerShell

References

External links
 Querying with WQL
 WQL Operators
 WQL-Supported Date Formats
 WQL-Supported Time Formats
 WQL (SQL for WMI)
 Using WQL with the WMI Provider for Server Events
 WMI Queries
 Learn WMI Query Language using PowerShell

Windows technology
SQL